Georges (Armand Paul) Jacob (19 August 1877 – 28 December 1950) was a French organist, improviser and composer.

Biography 
Born in Paris, Georges Paul made his first musical studies at the École Niedermeyer de Paris. After he joined the Conservatoire de Paris in 1896, he won a First prize in organ in 1900, in Alexandre Guilmant's class. From 1892 to 1912, G. Jacob gave organ recitals, which were very well attended at the Schola Cantorum de Paris. His aim was to bring out the best of both ancient and modern works of organ literature.

As a composer, he has already written and published many works. In addition, he began publishing, with an explanatory commentary, the great works for organ of J.-S. Bach.

From 1902 to 1914, he was a piano teacher at the Schola Cantorum.

In 1922, he succeeded Joseph Bonnet as organist of the Orchestre de la Société des Concerts du Conservatoire.

Georges Jacob died in Paris on 28 December 1950 and was buried in the Père Lachaise Cemetery (2nd division).

Compositions

Works for organ 
 1906: Prélude Funèbre et Variation
 1907: Symphonie pour grand orgue in E minor (Leduc): I. Prélude funèbre, Fugue, Variation II. Andante III. Scherzo IV. Final.
 1909: Quatre Morceaux for organ (Kistner, Leipzig): 1. Invocation 2. Noël 3. Au cloître 4. Dans la lande.
 1909: Douze Pièces pour Grand-orgue (Leduc) : 1. Pastorale (in E flat) 2. Offertoire pour Mariage 3. Noël Bourguignon 4. Invocation 5. Duetto 6. Canzonetta 7. Prélude Funèbre 8. Carillon 9. Magnificat (in F) 10. Alleluia 11. Andantino 12. Sortie.
 1909: Pastorale "Les Heures Bourguignonnes", collection of 12 pieces from 12 scenes by Maurice Léna (Leduc): 1. Lever de soleil 2. Le réveil 3. Le départ du troupeau 4. Vendanges 5. La chanson du berger 6. Midi 7. La pluie 8. Sous le noyer 9. En revenant des vignes 10. Chanson de pressoir 11. La ronde 12. Tombée du soir.
 1911: Entrée de Mariage
 1911: 1re Suite religieuse (Schirmer): 1. Laudes 2. Resurrexi (Introït du jour de Pâques) 3. Méditation 4. Au Prieuré 5. Bénédiction.
 1911: 2e Suite religieuse (Schirmer): 1. Invocation 2. Angelus 3. Souvenir grégorien 4. Communion 5. Prière du soir.
 1916: Impressions dominicales (Schirmer): 1. Veni Creator 2. Recueillement 3. Bergerade mélancolique 4. Hélas ! 5. Souffrance, Trouble, Triomphe.
 Exercices pour grand orgue (ou piano pédalier) (United Music Publishers).
 Livre d’orgue (Éditions Ouvrières): 1. Invention 2. Pastorale 3. Canon 4. Louange de l’oiseau 5. Choral 6. Mouvement.

Works for harmonium 
1909: 25 Pièces pour harmonium (Leduc).
1911: Choral varié; Prise de voile; Andante in D major, in Parnasse des Organistes du XXe, vol. 1, Paris
1911: 14 Pièces pour harmonium (Loret).
 Andantino in E flat major, in Joseph Joubert, Maîtres contemporains de l'orgue, vol. 1, Paris, 1912.
 Pastorale in F-sharp minor (transcription for harmonium by the author), in J. Joubert, Maîtres contemporains de l'orgue, vol. 1, Paris, 1912.

Works for piano 
 Nocturne, Légende et Scherzo.

Other compositions 
Several melodies and hymns.

Sources 
 Joseph Joubert, Anthology Maîtres contemporains de l'orgue, vol. 1, Paris, Sénart, 1912.
 , Dictionnaire des organistes français des XIXe et XXe siècles, Brussel, Mardaga, 2003.

References

External links 
 Georges Jacob on Paris en images
 IMSLP various scores.
 Sibley Music Library Scores of works for organ.
 Free scores by Georges Jacob on loumy.org
 Concerts et émissions d'orgue à la radio française de 1924 à 1940 on FranceOrgue

20th-century French composers
French male composers
French classical organists
French male organists
French music educators
Conservatoire de Paris alumni
1877 births
1950 deaths
Musicians from Paris
Burials at Père Lachaise Cemetery
20th-century French male musicians
Male classical organists